City vs Country Origin was an annual Australian rugby league football match that took place in New South Wales between City and Country representative sides. The City side represented the Sydney metropolitan area. While technically it was Sydney vs. the rest of NSW, players from the Central Coast (such as Matt Orford and Mark O'Meley) often represented City, but other players from the Central Coast (such as Chris Heighington) represented Country. The Country side represented the rest of New South Wales.

The concept of an annual clash between a City and Country team originally started in 1911 with a Metropolitan side taking on the Country team. The first match officially took place on 10 June 1911 with City taking the victory 29 to 8. It would take another seventeen years before an annual clash between an official City and Country side was agreed upon during the 1928 season.

Both sides were originally made up of the best players playing in the Country Rugby League of New South Wales and the Sydney-based NSWRL Premiership. However, the increasing drain of players from rural areas to the NSWRL clubs led to the City side becoming increasingly dominant and the Country side uncompetitive. The 'origin rule' for player qualification being introduced in 1987 so players in NSWRL clubs originally from outside Sydney became eligible to represent Country.

The players who represented the City and Country sides came from the National Rugby League competition in Australia. The match was played before the State of Origin series and was often referred to as a selection trial for the New South Wales Blues team.

On 21 November 2016, the NRL announced that the City v Country annual match would be scrapped, with the 2017 match to be the final edition.

On 29 April 2021, the NSWRL announced the return of an expanded City vs Country representative round, featuring Under 16's, Under 18's and Open Age Men's games, Open Age Women's games, and Wheelchair and Physical Disability games.  On 15 May 2021 the under age men's games and the women's game were played at Bankwest Stadium in Parramatta, while the wheelchair game was played at Shellharbour, NSW.  On 16 May 2021 the physical disability and the men's game were played at Collegians Sports Complex in Figtree, NSW.

The city vs country came back in 2022 with the 16s, 18,s and women's  played at 4 Pines Park, the wheelchair game was played at Niagra Park Stadium and the rest of the games were played at Leichhardt Oval with the men's  game being won by Country beating City 36–34 on Sunday May 15

History
Country versus City had long played a part in New South Wales sporting history, with the first traces of the concept being linked back as far as 1886. The then Southern Rugby Football Union (later to become the NSWRU) would hold an annual `test match' between a Combined Countrymen and Metropolis sides, with the match to be used by the organisation for picking players for NSW.

The concept took off and by the early 1900s `Country Week', as it was titled, became a major component of the Rugby calendar. This rivalry between City and Country continued to occur after Rugby League was formed in 1907. However, it was only in 1911 that rugby league held its first recorded City V Country clash. While there is some indication that a match may have been played in 1910, the code's infancy probably resulted in the game not being of a high enough standard to be recorded.

The representative match was played on a laissez-faire basis in League up until 1928 when the Country Rugby League and New South Wales Rugby League saw the value in making the tournament an annual match. This was understandable at the time for League, as many areas in Country NSW had not even heard of League until late 1927.

Newcastle was the first non-Sydney town to take up the code in 1909 in its own domestic competition, which was boosted by the participation of the Newcastle Rebels in the NSWRL Sydney competition in 1908 and 1909. The Illawarra region followed in 1910, but further away from Sydney it took longer for the code make any impact.

By the time the match was made a permanent fixture, interest in the concept was high enough to make it sustainable. However, similar to State of Origin before 1980, Country Rugby League faced the problem of its major players being snapped up by the richer Sydney clubs, draining the regional representative sides. This assisted City's domination of the fixture.

It was not until 1987, with the recent inclusions of Canberra, Illawarra and Newcastle in the NSWRL competition, that the "player drain" issue was addressed. The Origin rule, which was also used to revive the State of Origin concept, proved invaluable in giving Country the player base it needed to compete with the City team. However, Country only recorded their first win five years after the concept was introduced, in 1992.

Country then won three out of the five years after their first Origin victory before the City vs Country concept was removed from the representative scene (much like the World Sevens and Kangaroo Tours) as a result of the Super League War.

The competition was not revived until four years later, when the National Rugby League saw the match's value in terms of media exposure, television ratings and the merit of taking the fixture to country towns (the last time the game was played in Sydney was 1993 at Parramatta Stadium while the last full time NRL ground to host the game was WIN Stadium in Wollongong).

The last fixture was played in Mudgee on 7 May 2017, with more NRL games being played in regional New South Wales instead.

City vs Country results

Overall summary
Games played: 93

Year by year
The table below shows the results of the annual City vs Country games from 1928 to the present day. The colour of the year denotes the team that has won or retained the shield.

2017 City vs Country Match

Squads

1 - Euan Aitken was originally selected to play but withdrew due to injury. Mitchell Aubusson was shifted from Second Row to Centre and Aitken was replaced by Daniel Alvaro.

Match details

Women's City vs Country Origin
The Women's City vs Country Origin is the Women's rugby league version of the game and has been running since 2017.

2017 Women's City vs Country Match

Squads

Match details

See also

 List of Country Origin team players
 List of New South Wales City Origin rugby league team players
 New South Wales Country Rugby League
 New South Wales Rugby League
 Rugby league in New South Wales
 State of Origin series

References

External links
 Previous City vs Country match details
 Country Origin – Official site.

 
Nine's Wide World of Sport
Rugby league matches
Rugby league rivalries
Rugby League State of Origin
Recurring sporting events established in 1911
Sports leagues established in 1911
Sports rivalries in Australia
1911 establishments in Australia
2017 disestablishments in Australia